The San Francisco Bay Area, which includes the major cities of San Francisco, Oakland, and San Jose, hosts six major league sports franchises, as well as several other professional and college sports teams, and hosts other sports events.

Major league teams

American football 
The Bay Area is home to the National Football League San Francisco 49ers, who play at Levi's Stadium The 49ers have won five Super Bowls (XVI, XIX, XXIII, XXIV, XXIX) and lost two (XLVII, LIV).

Baseball
The Bay Area is home to two Major League Baseball teams. The San Francisco Giants play at Oracle Park and have won eight World Series titles (three as the San Francisco Giants (2010, 2012, and 2014) and five as the New York Giants). 
The Oakland Athletics play at the Oakland Coliseum, and the A's have won nine World Series titles (four as the Oakland Athletics, (1972, 1973, 1974, and 1989) and five as the Philadelphia Athletics).

The 1989 World Series was known as the "Earthquake Series", "Bay Bridge Series", and "Battle of the Bay", as both teams played against each other, and Oakland swept the Giants in a 4-game series. However, the series is probably best known for the 1989 Loma Prieta earthquake which struck on the day of Game 3.

San Francisco was ranked #1 in 2012 among America's Best Baseball cities. The study examined which U.S. metro areas have produced the most Major Leaguers since 1920.

Basketball
The Golden State Warriors returned to San Francisco beginning with the 2019–20 NBA season when the new Chase Center opened in the Mission Bay district. Originally, the Warriors played in Philadelphia, but relocated to San Francisco in 1962 and then to Oakland in 1971. During their days in Oakland, the Warriors won four NBA Finals (1975, 2015, 2017, 2018). Their first ever championship while residing in the San Francisco limits came in 2022.

Ice hockey
San Jose hosts the San Jose Sharks of the National Hockey League and play at the SAP Center at San Jose. The Sharks began play in 1991, playing their first two seasons at the Cow Palace before moving to their current home in 1993. They have been Pacific Division champions six times, as well as having won the Presidents' Trophy for the best regular season record in the league in 2009, and the Clarence S. Campbell Bowl as the Western Conference champions in 2016. Though the Sharks have yet to win a Stanley Cup, they made their first Stanley Cup Finals appearance in 2016.

Soccer

Beginning in 1996, the San Jose Earthquakes, then known as the San Jose Clash, competed in Major League Soccer, and became the Earthquakes in 1999. The Quakes won MLS Cup 2001 against the Los Angeles Galaxy 2–1, as well as MLS Cup 2003 against the Chicago Fire 4–2. The Quakes then moved to Houston in 2005, and became the Houston Dynamo, but in a fashion similar to the Cleveland Browns move, the Earthquakes name and history stayed in San Jose for a future team. In 2008, the current incarnation of the Earthquakes made its return and subsequently played seven seasons at Buck Shaw Stadium in Santa Clara. In March 2015, the Earthquakes opened Avaya Stadium, now known as PayPal Park, across from San Jose International Airport. The Bay Area was a host of the 1994 FIFA World Cup and will also serve as one of eleven US hosts of the 2026 FIFA World Cup.

Major league professional championships

Oakland Athletics (MLB) 
4 World Series titles

 1972
 1973
 1974
 1989

San Francisco Giants (MLB) 
3 World Series titles

2010
2012
2014

San Francisco 49ers (NFL) 
5 Super Bowl titles

 1981 (XVI)
 1984 (XIX)
 1988 (XXIII)
 1989 (XXIV)
 1994 (XXIX)

Oakland Raiders (NFL) 
2 Super Bowl titles

 1976 (XI)
 1980 (XV)

Golden State Warriors (NBA) 
5 NBA Finals titles

 1975
 2015
 2017
 2018
 2022

Oakland Oaks (ABA) 
1 ABA Finals title

 1969

Oakland Clippers (NASL) 
1 NASL Final title

 1967

San Jose Earthquakes (MLS) 
2 MLS Cup titles

 2001
 2003

Minor league teams

Baseball
The San Jose Giants are a Minor League Baseball team in Low-A West. They've been a farm team of the San Francisco Giants since 1988 and have played continuously since 1962 under several different names and affiliations. The San Jose Giants have developed more than 190 major league players, including current and former San Francisco Giants such as Buster Posey, Tim Lincecum, Matt Cain, Pablo Sandoval, and Madison Bumgarner.

The Pacific Association of Professional Baseball Clubs is an independent baseball league with three teams in the northern and eastern parts of the Bay Area. The league is currently on hiatus due to the pandemic.

In the Bay Area Collegiate League, Palo Alto is home to the Palo Alto Oaks, the oldest continuously-operated, wood-bat, baseball team in the Bay Area. The Oaks played their inaugural season in 1950, making 2018 their 69th consecutive season of baseball. They are joined by
seven other teams in the Bay Area: Alameda Merchants, Burlingame Bucks, San Carlos Salty Dogs, San Mateo Rounders, Solano Mudcats, Walnut Creek Crawdags, and the West Coast Kings.

Soccer
Amateur men's soccer has been played in San Francisco since 1902 through the San Francisco Soccer Football League. Over 40 teams in 4 divisions play throughout the city between March and November. Premier Division games are played at the 3,500-seat Boxer Stadium. Amateur women's soccer is played on over 30 teams in the Golden Gate Women's Soccer League.

Supporter-owned San Francisco City FC, founded in 2001 as part of the SFSFL, has played in USL League Two since 2016.

San Francisco Glens SC, commonly known as SF Glens, is an American soccer club based in San Francisco that was founded in 1961. Their first team currently competes in USL League Two.

Project 51O is a soccer club from Oakland, California competing in the Southwest Division of USL League Two. They are the reserve club of USL Championship club Oakland Roots SC.

El Farolito is an amateur soccer club based out of San Francisco, California. It currently plays in the National Premier Soccer League.

Napa Valley 1839 FC is a men's soccer club based in Napa, California. It competes in the NPSL Golden Gate Conference. The club's colors are green and white.

Sonoma County Sol is an American soccer team based in Santa Rosa, California, United States. Founded in 2004, the team plays in the National Premier Soccer League

Other sports 

In 2015, the Sharks American Hockey League affiliate team, the Worcester Sharks, became the San Jose Barracuda and share the SAP Center at San Jose until the 2021-2022 season. The San Jose Barracuda now play their home games at the sparkling new Tech CU Arena next to the San Jose Municipal Stadium and adjacent to San Jose State CEFCU Stadium.

The San Francisco Pro-Am Basketball League is an important summer league venue for aspiring players to be discovered by talent scouts. Games are held at the 4,000 seat Kezar Pavilion. Players from all levels participate, with regular appearances by off season NBA professionals.

San Francisco Rush played in the inaugural 2016 PRO Rugby season at Boxer Stadium. The club folded after one season. The San Francisco Golden Gate Rugby team competes in the Pacific Rugby Premiership. In rugby sevens, the Bay Area hosted the 2018 Rugby World Cup Sevens at AT&T Park which saw over 100,000 in attendance over the three days of the tournament.

The Silicon Valley Strikers and Bay Blazers are teams playing in the 2021 inaugural season of Minor League Cricket.

The San Francisco FlameThrowers Ultimate (sport) team were founded in 2014 when the American Ultimate Disc League (AUDL) expanded to the west coast. In 2017, the Flamethrowers won the AUDL Championship game, with a final score of 30-29 over the Toronto Rush. The FlameThrowers folded after the 2018 season, but maintained rights to the FlameThrower brand and hinted at a rebirth as a women's team.

The Oakland Spiders ultimate team also joined the league in 2014 as the then San Jose Spiders. They won the league championship during their inaugural year and the following year in 2015. They play home games at Foothill College Stadium.

The Oakland Panthers of the Indoor Football League were set to begin play in 2020 at Oakland Arena, looking to fill the hole left by the Raiders' departure, but the season was canceled by the onset of the COVID-19 pandemic. The team also withdrew from the 2021 season, then moved to San Jose as the Bay Area Panthers for 2022.

College sports
The Bay Area is also well represented in college sports. Six area universities are members of NCAA Division I, the highest level of college sports in the country. Three have football teams and three do not. Bay Area Deportes is the only media outlet in San Francisco Bay Area to fully cover NCAA college sports in Spanish.

All three football-playing schools in the Bay Area are in the Football Bowl Subdivision, the highest level of NCAA college football. The California Golden Bears and Stanford Cardinal compete in the Pac-12 Conference, and the San Jose State Spartans compete in the Mountain West Conference. The Cardinal and Golden Bears are intense rivals, with their football teams competing annually in the Big Game for the Stanford Axe. One of the most famous games in the rivalry is the 1982 edition, when the Golden Bears defeated the Cardinal on a last-second return kickoff known as "The Play".

The three non-football Division I programs in the Bay Area are the San Francisco Dons, located in the city of San Francisco; the Saint Mary's Gaels, from Moraga in the East Bay; and the Santa Clara Broncos, located in Santa Clara. All three are charter members of the West Coast Conference, and consider each other major rivals.

The following table shows the college teams in the Bay Area that average more than 2,000 attendance:

Other sports
The Bay Area hosted the 2013 America's Cup. The Bay Area has a leading and innovative alternative, outdoor and action sports culture. Examples include mountain biking, Alcatraz triathlon, team handball (Olympic handball), skateboarding/Thrasher Magazine, CrossFit (Santa Cruz) and surfing at well known breaks such as Steamer Lane, Mavericks, Ocean Beach and Bodega Bay.

TPC Stonebrae is a private golf club that hosts the TPC Stonebrae Championship, part of the Korn Ferry Tour since 2009.

SF CALHEAT is a Team Handball club which participates in tournaments across the nation at all levels

San Francisco Team Handball is the only team handball club focused on youth (U14 / Middle School) and (U18 / High School), competing at local and international levels.

Esports 
San Francisco Shock is an American professional Overwatch esports team based in San Francisco, California. The Shock compete in the Overwatch League (OWL) as a member of the league's Pacific West Division. They are currently the 2-time Overwatch League Grand Finals Champions.

Founded in 2017, San Francisco Shock is one of the twelve founding members of the OWL and is one of three professional Overwatch teams in California. The team is owned by Andy Miller, co-owner of the Sacramento Kings and NRG Esports. In the upcoming season, the team will play their home matches at Zellerbach Hall in Berkeley and the San Jose Civic in downtown San Jose.

The League of Legends World Championship was held in 4 locations, one of them being held in San Francisco, California at the Chase Center.

Recreation 

With an ideal climate for outdoor activities, San Francisco has ample resources and opportunities for amateur and participatory sports and recreation. Extensive public tennis facilities are available in Golden Gate Park and Dolores Park, as well as at smaller neighborhood courts throughout the city. San Francisco residents have often ranked among the fittest in the U.S. Golden Gate Park has miles of paved and unpaved running trails as well as a golf course and disc golf course.

Boating, sailing, windsurfing and kitesurfing are among the popular activities on San Francisco Bay, and the city maintains a yacht harbor in the Marina District. The St. Francis Yacht Club and Golden Gate Yacht Club are located in the Marina Harbor. The South Beach Yacht Club is located next to AT&T Park and Pier 39 has an extensive marina.

Historic Aquatic Park located along the northern San Francisco shore hosts two swimming and rowing clubs. The South End Rowing Club, established in 1873, and the Dolphin Club maintain a friendly rivalry between members. Swimmers can be seen daily braving the typically cold bay waters.

Defunct or relocated teams

Basketball
San Jose had a women's basketball team from 2005 to 2006 in the National Women's Basketball League called the San Jose Spiders.

American football
From 1960 until 1982 and again from 1995 until 2019 the Bay Area was home to the Oakland Raiders of the National Football League. The Raiders played at the Oakland Coliseum and won two Super Bowls during their stay in Oakland (XI, XV,), and lost two (II, XXXVII). Prior to the 2020 NFL season, the Raiders relocated to Las Vegas, Nevada where they are now known as the Las Vegas Raiders.

From 1995 to 2008, as well as between 2011 and 2015, the Bay had the San Jose SaberCats of the Arena Football League, who played at the SAP Center at San Jose. The SaberCats won 3 ArenaBowls (XVI, XVIII, XXI), and lost in another (XXII).

The Bay Area had a United Football League team in 2009 named the California Redwoods, who played at AT&T Park and Spartan Stadium, though the Redwoods moved to Sacramento in 2010.

Hockey 
Before the Sharks, the Bay Area had the California Golden Seals, who had been previously named the California Seals and the Oakland Seals.  The Seals came into existence in the 1967 NHL expansion. The Seals played at the Oakland–Alameda County Coliseum Arena (now Oracle Arena). The Seals later became the Cleveland Barons in 1976 and then merged with the Minnesota North Stars in 1978 (who in turn later became the Dallas Stars). The Golden Seals/Barons franchise is notable as the last franchise in North America's four major leagues to permanently cease operations.

For one season (1995–96), it was home to the San Francisco Spiders of the International Hockey League.

The San Francisco Bulls were founded as an expansion team in the ECHL and began play in the 2012–13 season. The team was based at the Cow Palace and was the farm team of the NHL's San Jose Sharks before folding mid-season on January 27, 2014.

Soccer
Before the existence of the current San Jose Earthquakes of MLS, a separate San Jose Earthquakes played for the original North American Soccer League, Major Indoor Soccer League, and the Western Soccer Alliance. After they folded, the San Francisco Bay Blackhawks played for the WSA. Eventually, the Blawkhawks became the San Jose Hawks, and folded in 1993.

San Jose Grizzlies were a professional indoor soccer team based in San Jose, California. The team was founded in 1993 as a member of the Continental Indoor Soccer League. After playing in the 1994 and 1995 CISL seasons, the Grizzlies folded following the 1995 season. The team played at San Jose Arena.

FC Gold Pride was a charter member of Women's Professional Soccer, playing alongside the Earthquakes in the league's inaugural 2009 season before moving to Hayward for 2010. Led by Brazilian star Marta, the team had a championship season in 2010, but folded after the season. WPS itself played only one more season before folding. The Bay Area has yet to have a franchise in WPS' effective successor, the current National Women's Soccer League.

San Francisco Deltas was a charter member of the second North American Soccer League to play at the Kezar Stadium in 2017. The Deltas beat the New York Cosmos 2–0 to win the Soccer Bowl 2017, but folded after the season.

Stadiums and arenas

Current

Defunct

Notes

References

External links
 San Francisco Bay Kayak and Canoe put-ins A collaboratively edited index of public put-ins helping to develop a water trail network.